Amaxia duchatae is a moth of the family Erebidae. It was described by Hervé de Toulgoët in 1987. It is found in French Guiana.

References

Moths described in 1987
Amaxia
Moths of South America